Raid of Sa'd ibn Zaid al-Ashhali, took place in January 630 AD, 8AH, 9th month, of the Islamic Calendar, in the vicinity of al-Mushallal. Sa'd ibn Zaid al-Ashhali was sent to demolish the images of the gods worshipped by the polytheist tribes around the area.

Raid to demolish al-Manat

In the same month as the mission of Khalid ibn al-Walid to destroy al-Uzza and the Suwa, Sa‘d bin Zaid Al-Ashhali was sent with 20 horsemen to Al-Mashallal to destroy an idol called Manāt, worshipped by the polytheist Al-Aws and Al-Khazraj tribes of Arabia. Here also a black woman appeared, naked with disheveled hair, wailing and beating on her chest. Sa‘d immediately killed her, destroyed the idol and broke the casket, returning at the conclusion of his errand.

The group who carried out this raid were formerly devoted worshippers of al-Manat . According to some sources, among them ibn Kalbi, Ali was sent to demolish al-Manat; however, Sir William Muir claims there is more evidence to suggest that the raid was carried out by Sa'd, and that it would have been out of character for Muhammad to send Ali, since Muhammad had been sending former worshippers to demolish idols.

Muir also mentions that, similarly to the aforementioned incident, during the Expedition of Khalid ibn al-Walid to Nakhla, an Ethiopian woman was killed, whom Muhammad claimed was the real al-Uzza. According to Muir, Muhammad said that the woman slain in this incident was the Goddess of the Al-Aws and Al-Khazraj tribes, i.e. Manat.

Islamic Primary sources

The Muslim historian Hisham Ibn Al-Kalbi, mentions this event as follows:

The event is also mentioned by Ibn Sa'd, in his book "Kitab al-tabaqat al-kabir, Volume 2". he mentions that the raid was carried out by Sa'd ibn Zaid al-Ashhali.

See also
Military career of Muhammad
List of expeditions of Muhammad

Notes

630s conflicts
Campaigns ordered by Muhammad
630
Persecution of Pagans